Mark Thomas Casey Haapala is an American producer, screenwriter, and director. He directed the award-winning short film Dog It Down, winner of the 2012 Hollywood Reel Independent Film Festival (HRIFF). Haapala also served as executive producer and head writer for the TV Pilots: Off The Record, The Groom Whisperer and Pinky and The Fan Girls, which was optioned by the Lifetime channel and was a winner at the New York Television Festival as "Best Unscripted TV show" in 2014.

Early life
Haapala was born in Irvine, California to parents Susan (née Casey) and Thomas Haapala, a VP at Black & Decker Corporation  . He graduated from Loyola Marymount University in 2002 with a degree in theatre, along with actor Chris Sullivan. He attended LMU at the sametime as: Desean Terry, Leroy McClain, Colin Hanks and Busy Philipps. One of Haapala's first jobs in entertainment was as Jerry Ferrara (Turtle's) stand-in on the HBO show Entourage.

Career
Dog It Down, Haapala's first short film was based on the true story of three US Navy Sailors who were trapped under water for 17 days in an air tight compartment aboard the USS West Virginia during the Japanese attack on Pearl Harbor. Dog It Down was partially funded and executive produced by Entourage actor Kevin Connolly. The short film would go on to win the 2012 Hollywood Reel Independent Film Festival, and was screened and received accolades at: the GI Film Festival, The Newport Beach Film Festival, and would later air on both PBS and the Military channel.

He appeared as "The Clapper" in the Season 5 episode 11 of Entourage entitled "Play’n With Fire".

In 2010, Haapala was accepted into the Directors Guild of America Trainee program as an assistant director trainee.

He is a member of the Producers Guild of America.

Haapala and writing partner, Stewart Gold penned an original romantic comedy, The Groom Whisperer, for Larry Levinson Productions in 2013. The duo also created the reality show Pinky and the Fangirls which was optioned by the Lifetime Channel in 2014. It starred actor Keith Coogan and his wife, Kristen "Pinky" Coogan.

Haapala co-wrote and directed the 2014 Independent TV pilot Off The Record which was screened at Tribeca Cinemas as part of the 2014 New York Television Festival.

Awards and nominations
Awards
Hollywood Reel Independent Film Festival (2012) – Best Short Film – Dog It Down
New York Television Festival (2014) – Best Unscripted TV Show – Pinky and the Fangirls

References

External links 
 

American film directors
American film producers
1980 births
Living people